A list of films produced by the Bollywood film industry based in 1984:

Top-grossing films
The top-grossing films at the Indian Box Office in 
1984:

1984 A-Z

References

External links
 Bollywood films of 1984 at the IMDb

1984
Lists of 1984 films by country or language
Films, Bollywood